Abie the Agent is an American comic strip about a Jewish car salesman by Harry Hershfield. It debuted in 1914.

Publication history 
When Hershfield had success with a Yiddish character in his comic strip Desperate Desmond, he was encouraged by his editor to create a new strip concerning Yiddishism and Jewish immigrants in the United States. The strip debuted in the New York Journal on February 2, 1914.

The strip became popular and other cartoons were made. The titles were "Iska Worreh" (Aug 5) and "Abie Kabibble Outwitting His Rival" (Sept 23).

After the strip dated January 24, 1932, the comic strip went on hiatus, due to a contract dispute between Hershfield and the syndicate, International Feature Service. The strip resumed in 1935 with the King Features Syndicate and ran until 1940.

The Sunday page included a topper. This was called Phooey Fables in January 1926, Dictated But Not Read from February until the end of 1926, and Homeless Hector from 1927 until the hiatus in 1932.

Characters and story
Abraham Kabibble, known as Abie the Agent, was the first Jewish protagonist of an American comic strip. Abie’s humorous caricature was a rebuttal of some of the Jewish stereotypes in caricatures, and represented a moderately successful middle-class immigrant. Abie and his friends had many typical Jewish characteristics, such as their names or their use of Yiddish words and accents, they also lacked many of the negative or malicious elements, such as exaggerated physical traits, found in the depictions of Jews from this time. Abie was in many ways indistinguishable from other Americans. During 1917, the character enlisted in the United States Army to help the U.S. forces in World War I.

The character lost many of his more typical Jewish characteristics over the decades, showing his successful integration but also slowly diminishing the particular features of this comic strip. The comic was produced by a Jewish artist, but can be considered discriminatory since it arguably only tried to promote the cultural assimilation of Jews as Americans, at the same time distinguishing them from other ethnicities like Mexicans or African Americans who were often depicted negatively. That, however, was the focus of the strip.

In popular culture 
An indication of the strip's popularity was the reference to ‘Abe Kabibble’ in the 1930 Marx Brothers movie Animal Crackers.

Two Animated shorts were made in 1917 by International Film Service.

See also
Edge City

References

External links
Hershfield biography at Comiclopedia
IMDb entry for Abie Kabibble Outwitted His Rival cartoon
IMDb entry for Iska Worreh cartoon

American comic strips
Fictional American Jews
Fictional salespeople
Gag-a-day comics
1914 comics debuts
1940 comics endings
American comics characters
Male characters in comics
Comics characters introduced in 1914
Comic strips started in the 1910s
Fictional immigrants to the United States
Fictional American Jews in comics
Jewish-related comics